Igor Božić (Serbian Cyrillic: Игор Божић, Slovenian: Igor Božič, born 14 July 1987) is a Bosnian-Herzegovinian professional football goalkeeper who most recently played for FK Proleter Teslić in the First League of the Republika Srpska.

Club career
Born in Postojna, nowadays in Slovenia, he played in the Serbian SuperLiga club FK Rad Belgrade between 2006 and 2009 with loan spells with FK Železničar Beograd in Serbian League Belgrade, and FK Pobeda in the Macedonian First League.

External sources
 Profile at Srbijafudbal

1987 births
Living people
People from Postojna
Association football goalkeepers
Bosnia and Herzegovina footballers
Slovenian footballers
FK Jedinstvo Brčko players
FK Rad players
FK Pobeda players
FK Proleter Teslić players
Serbian SuperLiga players
Serbian First League players
Macedonian First Football League players
First League of the Republika Srpska players
Bosnia and Herzegovina expatriate footballers
Expatriate footballers in North Macedonia
Bosnia and Herzegovina expatriate sportspeople in North Macedonia